Apparition is the second EP by American progressive metal band The Contortionist. It was self-released by the band on September 24, 2009. The release shows the band's first venture towards their progressive sound when compared to the previous EP Shapeshifter which features more of a traditional deathcore sound (with notably very little progressive elements). Apparition is also the band's only release with Dave Hoffman on vocals, Jonathan Carpenter would join the band immediately after his departure. Not long after the release of this EP, the band was signed to Good Fight and released their debut album, Exoplanet in the following year.

Cover art
The EP's artwork is a Hubble Space Telescope mosaic image assembled from 24 individual Wide Field and Planetary Camera 2 exposures taken in October 1999, January 2000, and December 2000 of the Crab Nebula.

Track listing

Notes
 The song "Predator" ends at 5:26. An untitled hidden track starts at minute 10:06.

Personnel
The Contortionist

 Dave Hoffman - vocals, synthesizers
 Robby Baca - guitars, synthesizers
 Cameron Maynard - guitars
 Chris Tilly -  bass guitar
 Joey Baca - drums

Production
Produced by The Contortionist and Jordan King
Engineered & mixed by Jordan King
Mastered by Jordan King of Voltaic Recording Indianapolis, IN

References

2009 EPs
The Contortionist albums
Progressive metal EPs